Khag is a tehsil in and block in the Beerwah sub-district of the Budgam district in the Indian union territory of Jammu and Kashmir.

Khag is renowned for its hot springs. According to locals, there are as many as thirty-five individual springs in Khag. Ancient people called it the "Garden of Paradise".

Before 2008, Khag was one of the blocks of Beerwah tehsil. After the government of Jammu and Kashmir created new administrative units in 2008, Khag was granted tehsil status.

Geography 
Khag is between 2,438 m (8,000 ft) and 4,267 m (14,000 ft) above sea level. It is located at the base of the Pir Panjal mountain range, surrounded by mountains of up to 5,181 m (17,000 ft). The area is covered with dense shrubbery and has many villages, including Nowrooz Baba, New Colony Khag, Poshker, Khanpora, Lassipora, Iskander Pora, Drung, Malpora, and Nagbal.

Local rivers and streams 
The Khag area has various streams and most of these come from upper reaches like Nowrooz baba and other areas. 
The main streams are Housh Kohl,  Mannar kohl and Lostar Kohl. 
The region contains forested areas with several mountain rivers and streams, including the Mala Kol, Kunze Kol, and Nala Gogaldara. The Mala Kol is locally known as the "deaf and dumb stream" due to a local legend: when saint Tajuddin sahab arrived in Khag, the stream silently followed him from Sukhnag to Sikandarpora.

Tourist destinations

Wistierwaan 
Wistierwaan is a large pasture at Nowrooz baba khag that is surrounded by dense forest having Pinus.  It is very beautiful place and in summer attracts various visitors from the state and also from local peoples.

Shrine of Baba Nowrooz Reshi 
The shrine of Baba Nowrooz reshi is in Nowrooz Baba Village and is about 3 km away from Khag.  It is very famous shrine and attracts large numbers of visitors in winter season as well as in summer.

Tosa Maidan 

The Tosa Maidan pasture is a large pasture that is surrounded by dense forests of deodars and pinus, giving it the appearance of a green carpet in summer. It is situated about 15 km (9.3 mi) from Khag in the Himalayas. In ancient times, shepherds from many countries used to visit the area and it was on the regular route for Mughals travelling to Poonch district and Punjab in Pakistan. Today the area is frequently used by local shepherds and the Gujjar community. Tosa Maida was leased to the Indian Army in 1964 for 50 years. After the army lease expired in April 2014, it was opened to the public by the government of Jammu and Kashmir.

The pasture can be accessed via the Basmai Gali pass at 3,962 m (13,000 ft). Another pass on its right side, Poonch Gali, leads to the Poonch valley. This pass was believed to be the safest, easiest, and nearest way to reach Punjab in ancient times. From here, a path also leads to Nilnag. Tosa Maidan is the largest pasture in the area at 11.7 km2 (4.5 sq mi).

Pehjan 
Pehjan is an alpine pasture situated about 25 km (15.5 mi) from Khag in the Himalayas. In the local language, it is called Nueer. The pasture is reached via a route from Khag to Gogaldara via Donwar, Brari Pather, Anzwaer, and Yanga Pather. It is serene, picturesque and rich in deodars, covered with various kinds of asters and several plants of saussurea lappa (Kuth), surrounded by lush green forests on four sides. In June, shepherds from nearby plains bring their cattle and sheep for grazing. On the way to Pehjan, there is a huge rock with seven pinus trees on its top (locally known as Satte Yaeer) which is considered to be the site of the miracle of Sheikh ul Alam Sheikh Noor Din Noorani. Beside this, another pinus tree standing on one of the big stones (locally known as "Palle Yaeer") is also considered to be part of his miracle. Wular Lake can be seen from the pasture.

Nakwaer Pal (Nocturnal Rock) 
Nakwaer Pal (the "nostril rock") is on the way to Pehjan. It is the highest peak in this range at 4,267 m (14,000 ft) high. It is believed that when the Kashmir Valley was a lake called Sati Sar, boats used to be tied up to this rock. It has an iron hook anchored within it. Ded Bal, also known as Lal Khanen Gher (the place of Lal Khan) also falls on the way to Pehjan. Shepherds and Gujjars come to Ded Bal from adjacent villages with their livestock.

Naranag 

Naranag, also known as Narain Nag, is a spring situated at the Khag bus stand. The spring is known for its fish, and a fish farm has been built by the fishery department of Jammu, and Kashmir. The water of the spring remains very cool during summer and warm during winter. The Tosa Maidan spring is considered to be the origin of this spring. According to locals the Tosa Maidan spring merges with Nara Nag several kilometers below the soil. According to local legend, an ascetic passing through Tosa Maidan once dropped a bag full of sheep dung into the lake. When he reached Naranag Khag several days later, he saw the dung floating on the surface of the Naranag. He returned to Tosa Maidan and sprinkled some turmeric powder into the lake, which also appeared in the water in the Naranag.

Sitaharan (Sutharan) 
Known for its spring, Sitaharan is located near Tosa Maidan and the Line of Actual Control. According to a local legend, Ram Chander stayed here during his twelve-year exile with Lakshman and Sita. The spring's name comes from Sita who is said to have bathed in the spring. The name was later changed to Sut Haran or Sutharan. Close to the spring is a rock where Sita sat, according to the legend. The spring is also said to be the origin of a small lake in Tosa Maidan.

Other places 
Poshker is a village 4 km (2.5 mi) from Khag, known for its scenic beauty. Pushkar Nag is a spring located to the east of Poshker, approximately 15 km (9.3 mi) from Khag, between Khag and Ferozpora. According to local history, Kashmiri Pandits would offer prayers and take a ritual dip in the spring during the month of Saawan. Some devotees continue to perform the ritual today. Gandhak Nag is a sulfur spring in the Drung Khaipora village of Khag. The healing properties of the sulfur make the spring locally significant.

Economy 

The local economy is largely agricultural. Crops include rice, mustard, vegetables, apples, walnuts, pears, apricots, cherries, and almonds. The economy in Khag includes smaller businesses such as carpet design (Kaleen in the Kashmiri language), shawl design, knit-work, and embroidery. Kashmiri carpets and shawls are marketed internationally, but due to increasing prices, family pressure, and low earnings, some local textile makers have shifted to focus on other businesses. The tehsil is also one of the main areas for the production of a variety of apples, which are sold by local growers throughout India. Due to growth in the education sector, the service sector has also increased. Professional jobs such as doctors, lawyers, engineers, and civil servants are also increasing in number.

Education 
Schools in the area include both government-run and private schools of varying levels. Khag is one of the educational zones of Budgam district, and has a Zonal Education Officer overseeing its education department.

Government schools 
 Government Higher Secondary Institute, Khag Budgam
Government Middle School Nowrooz Baba Khag
 Government Middle School (Boys), Khag
 Government Middle School (Girls), Khag
 Government Higher Secondary School, Drang, Khag
 Government Middle School, Charihara, Khag. 
 Government High School, Sunglipura, Khag
 Government High School, Poshkar, Khag
 Government Girls Middle School, Nagbal, Khag
 Government Boys and Girls Middle School, Trapai, Khag
 Government Boys Middle School, Khag
 Government Girls Middle School, Khag

Private schools 
 Andleeb Educational Services, Sugin, Khag
 Kohsar Public High School, Khag
 Kastoorwan Public School, Khag
 Royal Edge Public School, Idgah Colony Khag
 Nawrozbaba Public School, New Colony Khag
 Syed Masoom Public School, Hardu Suresh, Khag
 Taqwa Educational Institute larkipora khag 
 Islamic International School, New Colony Khag, Budgam

Transportation 
Khag is connected with state capital Srinagar via Aripanthan and Magam. It is also connected to Budgam district headquarters via the Beerwah Degree College road through Kangripora and Drung, and via the Aripanthan-Beerwah road.

The nearest railway station is Mazhama Railway Station, approximately 19 km (11.8 mi) away.

The closest airport is Srinagar International Airport, approximately 55 km (34.2 mi) away.

There are also several private transport companies and a 24-hour taxi service.

Healthcare facilities 

Tehsil Khag has three public health centers (PHC) in Khag, Poshkar, and Suthaharan, plus a number of sub-centers. They are associated with the government medical college at Srinagar, and specialists from the college are deputed to the health centers on a rotational basis. The main PHC in Khag has specialists from different branches of medicine, and advanced laboratories with a range of modern instruments.

References 

Villages in Budgam district